The 1993 All-Ireland Junior Hurling Championship was the 72nd staging of the All-Ireland Junior Championship since its establishment by the Gaelic Athletic Association in 1912.

Wexford entered the championship as the defending champions, however, they were beaten by Kilkenny in the Leinster final.

The All-Ireland final was played on 18 July 1993 at Croke Park in Dublin, between Clare and Kilkenny, in what was their first ever meeting in the final. Clare won the match by 3–10 to 0–08 to claim their second championship title overall and a first title since 1914.

Results

Leinster Junior Hurling Championship

Leinster first round

Leinster quarter-finals

Leinster semi-finals

Leinster final

Munster Junior Hurling Championship

Munster first round

Munster semi-finals

Munster final

All-Ireland Junior Hurling Championship

All-Ireland semi-final

All-Ireland final

References

Junior
All-Ireland Junior Hurling Championship